The Edmondson Avenue Historic District encompasses several neighborhoods on the west side of Baltimore, Maryland.  The area was developed primarily between 1900 and 1940, radiating from the streetcar line that ran along Edmondson Avenue, an east–west thoroughfare.  It includes significant portions of the Evergreen Lawn, Bridgeview/Greenlawn, Rosemont, and Midtown-Edmondson neighborhoods, including hundreds of buildings, many of them residential rowhouses.  Although initially populated by European-Americans, the neighborhood population became predominantly middle class African-American in the year after World War II, and became a center of civil rights activism and community organizing. The Red-Light District of Balitimore is also in close proximity to the district with houses in the area contributing to the cause.

The district was added to the National Register of Historic Places in 2010.

References

External links

, including undated photo and boundary map, at Maryland Historical Trust

African-American history in Baltimore
African-American middle class
Historic districts on the National Register of Historic Places in Baltimore